The Hermance is a river in France and Switzerland, that discharges into Lake Geneva. It rises near Loisin in Haute-Savoie, France, at  elevation. In its lower half, downstream from Veigy, it marks the Swiss-French border. It flows into Lake Geneva between the villages Hermance (Switzerland) and Chens-sur-Léman (France), at  elevation.

Flood control and other river maintenance issues are regulated under the 1959 Hermance River Agreement.

Notes and references

Rivers of France
Rivers of Switzerland
Rivers of the canton of Geneva
Rivers of Auvergne-Rhône-Alpes
Rivers of Haute-Savoie
France–Switzerland border
International rivers of Europe
Border rivers